Leanne Faye Benjamin  (born 13 July 1964) is a retired Australian ballet dancer who was a principal dancer with the Royal Ballet in London.

Early life and training
Benjamin was born in Rockhampton, Queensland, to Jill and Bernie Benjamin. Benjamin began ballet lessons at age three at a local dance school, and had attended The Range Convent and High School. In 1980, she was accepted into the Royal Ballet School at age 16. Within a year, she won two prestigious awards, the Adeline Genée Gold Medal and Prix de Lausanne, and trained at the Royal Ballet for two years. One of her teachers was Mona Vangsaae. At her graduation performance, she and Jonathan Cope performed the two lead roles in Giselle.

Ballet career
In 1983, at age 18, Benjamin joined the Sadler's Wells Royal Ballet (now Birmingham Royal Ballet), and became a principal dancer in 1987. The following year, she joined the London Festival Ballet (now English National Ballet), directed by Peter Schaufuss, Vangsaae's son. In 1990, she moved to Deutsche Oper Ballet in Berlin, where Schaufuss went on to direct. In Berlin, she worked with choreographer Kenneth MacMillan on Different Drummer. Encouraged by MacMillan, she joined The Royal Ballet as a First Soloist in 1992, making her company debut as Mary Vetsera in Mayerling, though MacMillan died shortly before that performance. The following year, she was promoted to principal dancer.

Benjamin is best known for dancing works by MacMillan. She was one of the last dancers to work with MacMillan, Royal Ballet founder Ninette de Valois and founding choreographer Frederick Ashton. She had also worked with other choreographers such as Christopher Wheeldon and Wayne McGregor. She had performed with Wheeldon's company, Morphoses/The Wheeldon Company.

In 2004 and 2009 she won the National Dance Award for Best Female Dancer.

In 2013, she retired after two decades with the Royal Ballet. She reprised her first role with The Royal Ballet, Mary Vetsera in Mayerling.

Repertory

Odette/Odile in Swan Lake, Giselle, the Sugar Plum Fairy in The Nutcracker, Aurora in Sleeping Beauty, Nikiya, Kitri, Swanilda, The Firebird, Cinderella, Lise, Titania, Manon, Anastasia, Juliet (Ashton and MacMillan), Mitzi Caspar and Mary Vetsera in Mayerling, Irina, The Girl in The Invitation, The Judas Tree, Song of the Earth, Gloria, Requiem, Rhapsody, Elite Syncopations, Les Biches, Symphony in C, Apollo, Danses Concertantes, Etudes, Brünnhilde in Béjart's Ring, Carmen, Forsythe's Herman Schmerman and Ashton's The Leaves Are Fading, Swanilda in Coppélia.

She has created roles in Bintley's Metamorphosis, The Snow Queen and Earth as part of Homage to The Queen, Bruce's Symphony in Three Movements and in Mr. Worldly Wise, Two-Part Invention, When We Stop Talking, Masquerade and most recently Wayne McGregor's Qualia, "Infra", and "Limen", Robert Garland's Spring Rites, Alastair Marriott's Tanglewood, Liam Scarlett's Despite and Wheeldon's DGV.

Post-ballet career
In honour of her career with The Royal Ballet, the Leanne Benjamin Awards were launched at a public masterclass at The Royal Ballet School on 12 June 2014. The awards were created and will be administered by The Tait Memorial Trust, of which Leanne Benjamin is a Patron.  The awards are scholarships for young Australian and New Zealand ballet dancers studying in the UK.

In January 2014, Leanne Benjamin was awarded the Critics’ Circle de Valois award for outstanding achievement.

Benjamin now works as a coach for both the Royal Ballet and other companies. She had also studied design and work as an interior designer.

Personal life
In 2001, Benjamin married Tobias Round, a theatre producer and son of Georgina Parkinson. The couple has a son, born in 2003.

Honours
In the 2005 New Year Honours, Benjamin was appointed an Officer of the Order of the British Empire (OBE) for her services to dance. Ten years later at the 2015 Australia Day Honours, Benjamin was appointed a Member of the Order of Australia (AM) for significant service to the performing arts, particularly ballet, as a dancer and role model.

References

External links
 Royal Opera House profile
 Portrait at the National Portrait Gallery

1964 births
Living people
Australian ballerinas
Members of the Order of Australia
Morphoses dancers
National Dance Award winners
Australian Officers of the Order of the British Empire
People educated at the Royal Ballet School
People from Rockhampton
Principal dancers of The Royal Ballet
Australian emigrants to England
Australian expatriates in England
Australian expatriates in Germany
Prima ballerinas